King Koopa's Kool Kartoons is a local, American live-action children's television show broadcast in Southern California during the Autumn of 1989. The show was produced by DIC Entertainment in association with Fox Television Studios for the Fox television station KTTV - 11 Los Angeles by Gerry Passwho developed and rolled out the Fox Kids Cluband DIC Animation City, in association with Nintendo. It was a live-action spin-off to The Super Mario Bros. Super Show!, a popular animated show based on the Super Mario video games. The show was discontinued after 65 episodes.

The show stars King Koopa, based on an animated version of Bowser, the central arch-villain from the Mario video game series. The 30-minute wrap around program was originally broadcast during late afternoon time slots, normally around 4:30pm to 5:30pm on the Los Angeles-based television channel KTTV Fox 11.

Format 
The format of the show was one of the last in the tradition of classic children's television shows in the vein of Bozo the Clown: the show would begin with the same pre-recorded theme song and lead into a live studio audience of around 40 to 60 children bussed in from around Los Angeles at the beginning of the show. The audience of children were all given special hats shaped like Koopa heads and T-shirts with "Koopa's Troopas" printed on them (the children would actually get to keep the shirts, but the troopa helmets, as they called them, were claimed by the producers at the end of the taping and reused every show). Koopa would then start talking to the audience with a different theme every day.

The live-action Koopa would then act as emcee, introducing old, public domain animated cartoon shorts, wrapped around different live-action segments, including a segment with Ratso, King Koopa's pet rat, a segment with Koopa reading fanmail, a segment with Mr. Mean Jeans, and a joke segment. King Koopa would then end the show by telling the audience to be a good Koopa Troopa or he would "Koopa Youpa'. After that, he would give contestants prizes with an envelope given by Ratso, King Koopa's pet rat.

Production
The show featured an actor in a King Koopa costume similar to one previously used in the Super Mario Bros.-themed Ice Capades show, only with a more detailed mask to make the actor look more believable on television. The actor playing Koopa (originally Chris Latta, later Pat Pinney) performed the role with a gruff, gravel-voiced faux-malevolence that ultimately revealed a hesitantly nice personality.

Unlike any previous appearance, King Koopa was seen with a pet creature named Ratso that best resembled a mix of dog and weasel with the large ears of a bat. Ratso had his own special "theater" where kids could also claim prizes (in which he was played by a puppet). Koopa would be seen walking Ratso on a leash in the pre-recorded opening and closing credit sequences (where he was played by a dog in a costume).

Partway through the series' production, Chris Latta was fired and replaced after a string of incidents occurred, including an altercation where Latta's own son was among the child audience. Additionally, after the firing of Latta, children noticed the difference between Latta and replacement actor Pat Pinney and would insult Pinney, or call him an imposter.

The entire 65 episodes of King Koopa's Kool Kartoons was produced and developed over the course of 13 weeks before being quietly cancelled.

Cancellation
Despite high ratings and viewership, King Koopa's Kool Kartoons was not renewed for a second season. The full reasoning behind the show's cancellation is unknown, but is partially accredited by former writer Christopher Brough to be a formal invitation from the then-president of The Walt Disney Company, Michael Eisner to Fox Kids to cancel the cartoon.

The show was later aired in the United Kingdom via The Children's Channel throughout the remainder of 1990.

Reception
Reception of the show among children was overwhelmingly positive, but the show was not received very well by parents, as an angry letter from the Los Angeles Times newspaper shows. However, in a "Viewers' View" column in the Los Angeles Times, a parent wrote that the show's portrayal of King Koopa was "frightening for small children".

In 1990, the program was nominated as the best youth program for the Los Angeles local Emmy Awards.

Legacy
Due to King Koopa's Kool Kartoon's one-time broadcast format, the show has become one of DIC Entertainment's and Nintendo's famous examples of lost media, and efforts to preserve the show have begun to materialize.

References

External links

 http://www.imdb.me/gerrypass?ref_=pro_nm_nav_ov_vanity

Television series based on Mario
1980s American children's television series
American television shows based on video games
Local children's television programming in the United States
American television shows featuring puppetry
Television series by DIC Entertainment
Television series by DHX Media
American television spin-offs